General elections were held in San Marino on 8 December 2019.

Electoral system

The 60 members of the Grand and General Council are elected by proportional representation, with seats allocated using the d'Hondt method. The electoral threshold is calculated by multiplying the number of parties running in the elections by 0.4, with a maximum possible threshold of 3.5%.

If no party receives a majority, or the two largest parties are unable to form a coalition government within thirty days of the elections, a runoff election will be held between the two most popular coalitions, with the winner receiving a seat bonus to give them a majority. It is the first time the facultative second round will be applied following its approval in a June 2019 referendum.

Campaign
Two electoral alliances were formed for the elections:
Libera, an alliance of the Democratic Socialist Left, Civic 10, Socialist Ideals Movement and Reforms and Development
Noi per la Repubblica, an alliance of the Socialist Party, Party of Socialists and Democrats, Democratic Movement San Marino Together and We Sammarineses

Results

Aftermath
Following the elections, a coalition government was formed by the Sammarinese Christian Democratic Party, the Tomorrow in Motion alliance and Noi per la Repubblica.

References

San Marino
General
San Marino
Elections in San Marino